Reece Joseph Staunton (born 10 December 2001) is a professional footballer who plays as a defender or defensive midfielder for Bradford (Park Avenue).

Born in England, he represents Ireland at youth international level.

Early and personal life
Staunton attended Bradford Academy.

Club career

Bradford City
He made his senior debut for Bradford City on 7 November 2017, at the age of 15 years 332 days, becoming the club's youngest ever player. He signed a two-year academy scholarship with the club in September 2017, having first joined at under-12 level.

He made his first appearance of the 2018–19 season in a 4–1 home defeat in the EFL Trophy on 9 October 2018. He was praised by manager David Hopkin for his performance in the match.

In August 2019 he moved on loan to Ossett United. He returned to Bradford City on 23 September 2019. He made his first City appearance of the 2019–20 season a few days later, in the EFL Trophy.

In November 2019 he moved on loan to Bradford (Park Avenue). The loan was extended in December 2019 for a further month, with Park Avenue manager Mark Bower praising Staunton. Later that month he turned professional with Bradford City, signing a contract until the end of the 2021–22 season. On 8 January 2020 the loan deal was ended early.

At the end of the 2019–20 season he was praised by new City manager Stuart McCall, who said Staunton was one of potentially four youngsters who would join the first-team for the 2020–21 season. Staunton was praised by club captain Richard O'Donnell after an impressive performance on the opening day of the 2020–21 season. In September 2020 he signed a new four-year contract with the club. Later that month he suffered an ankle injury, missing matches before being back in first-team contention towards the end of October.

In November 2020 he was one of a number of young Bradford City players playing in the first team who were praised by manager Stuart McCall. Later that month Staunton spoke about how his first-team run was improving his skills. On 30 November he was ruled out for 3 months due following a hamstring injury sustained in a match the week before. By March 2021 he was still continuing his recovery from the injury.

In July 2021, ahead of the start of the 2021–22 season, Staunton's teammate Niall Canavan told him to remain positive as he continued his rehabilitation from injury.

He was made available for loan to National League clubs in September 2021. He moved on loan to Bradford (Park Avenue) in November 2021. After returning from his loan in late 2021, he was made available for loan again in January 2022. The next month, following the departure of club captain and fellow defender Canavan, Staunton was challenged by manager Derek Adams to "push forward" and challenge for a first-team spot.

Bradford (Park Avenue)
In August 2022 he moved to Bradford (Park Avenue) for an undisclosed transfer fee, his third spell with the club.

International career
In November 2018 he was called up by the Republic of Ireland under-18 team, having first been involved with the national team set-up since the previous year.

Style of play
Speaking in May 2020, Bradford City manager Stuart McCall described Staunton by saying "he's adaptable because he can play left back, left centre half in a three and can sit in front of the back four. He's got a really good passing range".

Career statistics

References

2001 births
Living people
Footballers from Bradford
English footballers
Association football defenders
Association football midfielders
Republic of Ireland association footballers
Bradford City A.F.C. players
Ossett United F.C. players
Bradford (Park Avenue) A.F.C. players
English Football League players
National League (English football) players
Northern Premier League players